Pita Limjaroenrat (born 5 September 1980) is a Thai businessman and politician who is currently serving as the leader of the Move Forward Party, the de facto successor to the dissolved Future Forward Party.

Early life 
Pita was born on 5 September 1980. He is the eldest son of Pongsak Limjaroenrat, a former adviser to the Minister of Agriculture and Cooperatives, and Linda Limjaroenrat. He is the nephew of Padung Limjaroenrat, a former secretary to the Interior Minister and a close aide of then Prime Minister Thaksin Shinawatra.

Education 
Before being sent to New Zealand by his father, Pita initially attended classes at Bangkok Christian College as a child. He returned to Thailand and pursued a bachelor's degree in finance from the Faculty of Commerce and Accountancy in Thammasat University where he graduated in 2002 with first-class honors and got a scholarship to study at the University of Texas at Austin. He later on received an international student scholarship from Harvard University, becoming the first Thai student to do so. He went on to take up and jointly complete a Master of Public Policy degree in the John F. Kennedy School of Government of Harvard University and a Master of Business Administration degree in the Sloan School of Management of Massachusetts Institute of Technology.

Business career 
At age 25 and just a year into his master's degree, Pita had to return to Thailand to take over as managing director of CEO Agrifood, a rice bran oil business run by his family, after the death of his father. The company was able to regain its foothold two years after and allowed Pita to return to the United States where he finished his master's degree in 2011.

He also served as the executive director of Grab Thailand from 2017 to 2018.

Political career 
Pita initially joined as a member of Future Forward Party. Upon the invitation of party leader Thanathorn Juangroongruangkit, he accepted the offer to become a candidate in the 2019 Thai general election and won a seat in the House of Representatives as the fourth party-list representative for his party.

In July 2019, he delivered a speech in the House of Representatives where he discussed about the "Five-Button Theory" which called on the government to focus on the following agricultural policies: land ownership, farmers' debts, cannabis, agro-tourism, and water resources. Despite belonging to another party, his speech was praised by Interior Minister Anupong Paochinda.

Two weeks after the dissolution of his party, he was named as the new leader of Move Forward Party where he was joined by 54 other MPs of the disbanded party and was formally elected on 14 March 2020.

Personal life 
Pita was married to actress Chutima Teepanart on 12 December 2012 but got divorced in March 2019. They have one daughter named Pipim.

In 2008, he was named as one of CLEO Thailand's 50 Most Eligible Bachelors.

Notes

References

External links 
 
 
 Pita Limjaroenrat on National Assembly of Thailand HRIS website

Pita Limjaroenrat
Pita Limjaroenrat
Pita Limjaroenrat
Pita Limjaroenrat
Pita Limjaroenrat
Pita Limjaroenrat
Pita Limjaroenrat
Harvard Kennedy School alumni
MIT Sloan School of Management alumni
1980 births
Living people